The CECAFA organised Kagame inter club cup is an association football competition that is contested between the champions of the CECAFA affiliated countries plus one guest team.

The 2009 contest will take place between 30 June and 12 July 2009. The Tournament was originally scheduled to be held in Uganda, however the Ugandan authorities did not have the necessary money to host the event and it was handed to Sudan.

Participants

 Prisons FC
 Kampala City Council
 Banaadir Telecom FC
 AS Inter Star
 Miembeni
 Atraco
 Kartileh
 Tusker
 Mathare United
 TP Mazembe
 Al-Merreikh
 Hay Al-Arab

Officials

Referees

 Munyemana Hudu
 Aime Ndayisenga 
 Ali Farah
 Caleb Amwayi 
 Hussein El Fadil
 Rassa Librato 
 Charles Mbaga 
 Mufta Ngobi 

Assistant Referees

 Charles Nimpagaritse
 Egueh Yacin Hassan
 Rage Aden Marwa
 Hassan Fido
 Khalafala Abdel Aziz
 Mohammed Aarif
 Samuel Kayondo
 Ali Kombo

Group stage

Group A

Group B

Group C

Knockout stage
All times are East Africa Time (UTC+3)

The teams finishing the group stage in first and second position qualify for the quarter final stage. In addition, the best two third placed teams will also qualify.

Quarter-finals

Semi-finals

Third Place Play off

Final

Leading goal scorers

Notes

References

External links
 Official website

2009
2009
2009 in African football
2009 in Sudanese sport